Justin Miller may refer to:
Justin Miller (American football) (born 1984), American football player
Justin Miller (attorney) (born 1975), attorney
Justin Miller (barbershop)
Justin Miller (baseball, born 1977), former MLB relief pitcher (1977-2013)
Justin Miller (baseball, born 1987), MLB relief pitcher
Justin Miller (footballer) (born 1980), South African soccer player
Justin Miller (judge) (1888–1973)